Melanie Joy Mayron is an American actress and director of film and television.  Mayron is best known for her role as photographer Melissa Steadman on the ABC drama thirtysomething  for which she was won the Primetime Emmy Award for Outstanding Supporting Actress in a Drama Series in 1989, and was nominated for same award in 1990 and 1991. In 2018, the Santa Fe Film Festival honored Mayron for her outstanding contributions to film and television.

Personal life
Mayron was born in Philadelphia, Pennsylvania to Norma (née Goodman), a real estate agent, and David Mayron, a pharmaceutical chemist. Her family is Jewish; her father is from a Sephardic background (the original surname was "Mizrahi"), while her mother is of Russian Jewish descent. She trained as an actress at the American Academy of Dramatic Arts.

Mayron was in a long-term relationship with screenwriter and producer Cynthia Mort, with whom she shared co-parenting of their two children.

Career
Mayron appeared in the 1974 film Harry and Tonto, the 1976 movies Gable and Lombard and Car Wash, and the 1977 films The Great Smokey Roadblock and You Light Up My Life, and starred in 1978's Girlfriends. In the mid-1970s, she played Brenda Morgenstern's best friend, Sandy Franks, on three episodes of the sitcom Rhoda. In 1982, she played Terry Simon, the photographer, in director Costa-Gavras' political drama Missing.

In 1988, she co-wrote and co-produced the comedy film Sticky Fingers. In 1995, Mayron directed The Baby-Sitters Club, a film based upon the book series of the same name. She also directed the television movie Toothless (1997) starring Kirstie Alley and the movie Slap Her... She's French (2002), starring Piper Perabo (which appeared on television as She Gets What She Wants). In 2006, she appeared as a judge in the reality show Looking for Stars on the Starz! channel.

In addition to her role as a primary cast member on thirtysomething, she also directed episodes of the show, as well as episodes of In Treatment, The Fosters, Providence, Dawson's Creek, Ed, State of Grace, Nash Bridges, Wasteland, Tell Me You Love Me and The Naked Brothers Band; the latter series was created and showran by Mayron's former thirtysomething co-star Polly Draper.

In 2015, she directed and released on YouTube The Living Room Sessions, a collection of videos of up-and-coming musical artists performing acoustic sets in her living room.

Mayron has directed an episode of the Netflix original series GLOW, an episode of SEAL Team, an episode of The Enemy Within, and multiple episodes of the 2018 Charmed reboot, as well as Jane the Virgin.

Filmography

Film

Television

Director

Awards and nominations

See also
 List of female film and television directors
 List of lesbian filmmakers
 List of LGBT-related films directed by women

References

Further reading
 Ileane Rudolph. "Catching Up With Melanie Mayron," TV Guide. Issue 2701. January 2, 2005.

External links
 
  Melanie Mayron at Fandango
 Mayron's Goods (formerly Mayron's Good Baby), Melanie Mayron's Company for Natural Skin Products and Diaper Cream

Living people
20th-century American actresses
21st-century American actresses
American film actresses
American film directors
American television actresses
American television directors
American women film directors
LGBT film directors
LGBT television directors
LGBT actresses
American women television directors
American health care businesspeople
American people of Russian-Jewish descent
Jewish American actresses
Actresses from Philadelphia
American Academy of Dramatic Arts alumni
Outstanding Performance by a Supporting Actress in a Drama Series Primetime Emmy Award winners
21st-century American Jews
Year of birth missing (living people)